Aliki Stamatina Vougiouklaki (Greek: Αλίκη Σταματίνα Βουγιουκλάκη Greek pronunciation: [aˈlici stamaˈtina vuʝuˈklaci]; 20 July 1934 – 23 July 1996) was a Greek cinema and theater actress, singer and theatrical producer. She is one of the most popular actresses in Greece, and was given the title of the National Star of Greece. Theatrically, she mostly starred in renditions of widely known Broadway musicals as well as multiple Greek tragedy plays. Vougiouklaki died in 1996 at the age of 62, just three months after being diagnosed with pancreatic cancer.

Aliki Vougiouklaki made her stage debut in a 1953 Athens production of Molière's Le Malade imaginaire. Around the same time, she made her movie debut in The Little Mouse (1954). She then appeared in over 41 films, one of which, apart from the original Greek, also had a Turkish version but was never officially released in Turkey because of political issues between the two neighboring countries. The majority of her movies met with great success and in 1960 she won the award for Best Actress at the Thessaloniki International Film Festival for her performance in the movie Madalena.

Biography

Vougiouklaki was born in Marousi to Emmy Koumoundourou and Ioannis Vougiouklakis, who was the provincial governor of Arcadia in the Peloponnese during the war and was executed by the resistance organisation ELAS as a collaborator. She had two brothers, Takis Vougiouklakis (film director) and Antonis (an architect). As a student, she participated in school plays, which eventually led her to an acting career. In 1952, she secretly auditioned for National Theatre of Greece, passed the exams, and started attending classes. She graduated three years later.

Career
Her first theatrical role was in The Imaginary Invalid, Molière, in 1953, while her first movie, The Little Mouse, was in 1954. She appeared in 42 movies, mostly musicals, television programs, and theatrical productions. She co-starred with Dimitris Papamichail in most of the movies and in a number of theatrical plays.

She received the prize for lead woman's role at the inaugural Greek Cinema Festival in Thessaloniki in 1960 for her starring role in Madalena while the movie Ipolochagos Natassa (1970) was the biggest box office success in Greek Cinema.

In 1961 she established her own theatre company and presented successful theatrical plays. In 1962 she was contracted to star in Finos Films' English language film Aliki, My love (also known as Aliki). It premiered in London and New York in June 1963, and in Athens in 1964. However, it didn't receive the expected success. This failure to make it internationally was the reason she never again attempted an "international movie star" career.

She was popularly known in the press as the National Star of Greece—a term first coined by journalist Eleni Vlahou in 1959. Her last movie was "Nelly, The Spy" (Κατάσκοπος Νέλλη), in 1981. The decline of Greek Cinema prompted her to concentrate on her theatrical career, producing 53 plays. In 1975 she brought to the stage large scale musicals, which changed the usual Greek style of theatrical musical.

In 2008, her son published a biography of Vougiouklaki, Eho Ena Mistiko (I Have A Secret), the title of a song she sang in Maiden's Cheek. That same year, a television series based on the book aired on the Alpha TV channel.

Personal life
Vougiouklaki married her co-student in National Theater and co-player, Dimitris Papamichail, on 18 January 1965. On 4 June 1969 she gave birth to their son, Yiannis Papamichail. The couple got divorced in 1975 due to "Irreconcilable Differences". In 1992, in an interview with Nikos Hadjinikolaou, Vougiouklaki revealed that she secretly married Giorgos Iliadis, a Greek Cypriot businessman, on 25 January 1982 in Athens. They had met in 1976. The couple divorced only a couple of months later, due to personal reasons cited by Iliadis, which Vougiouklaki respected.

Death
In April 1996, while on tour in Thessaloniki performing the Greek version of The Sound of Music play, Vougiouklaki had severe stomachaches which she believed were caused by the antibiotics she was taking due to a case of bronchitis which had been bothering her. After performing tests at the Express Service, a medical diagnostic centre in Thessaloniki, she was diagnosed with hepatoma, a malignant tumour in her liver. Not having realised the gravity of the situation, she continued performing for another week before the tour was finally cancelled, with her last performance onstage on 28 April.

In Athens, a group of three doctors discovered that the actress had pancreatic cancer. On 7 May she travelled to Munich, where she underwent a series of additional tests. On 10 May Vougiouklaki returned to Greece. On 15 May she traveled to Massachusetts General Hospital in the U.S. in a final effort to be cured. On 19 May she returned permanently to Athens and finally, on 22 May, entered the Athens Medical Centre. On 14 July she fell into hepatic coma and had no communication with those around her. After two months in hospital Vougiouklaki died at 10:15 on 23 July 1996, 3 days after her birthday, in Athens Medical Centre. Her funeral was held in Athens Cathedral on 25 July 1996 and she was buried in the First Cemetery of Athens.

Trivia

The film I Aliki Sto Nautiko (1961) was filmed aboard the active Greek naval vessel Aetos D01, which previously saw action during World War 2 with the United States Navy as  USS Slater DE-766. Slater now operates as a museum ship in Albany, NY.
 Chtipokardia sto thranio (1963) was shot simultaneously in Greek and Turkish, with two different crews. Vougiouklaki starred in both versions, with her voice being dubbed in the Turkish version, Siralardaki heyecanlar.
 The film, Ipolochagos Natassa (1970) sold 751,000 tickets in Athens, which made it the most successful film in Greece, a record held for almost three decades before being broken by Safe Sex.
 She worked with writer Willy Russell when she performed in Shirley Valentine onstage in 1989.
 Scottish writer Ali Smith used a portrait of Vougiouklaki (from the picture Klotsoskoufi by Dinos Dimopoulos, 1960) in her book Artful about four lectures given at Oxford University by the writer.

Filmography

Cinema

Television

References

External links
 
 Aliki Vougiouklaki profile, Cine.gr 

1934 births
1996 deaths
Actresses from Athens
20th-century Greek women singers
Greek stage actresses
Greek film actresses
Deaths from pancreatic cancer
Deaths from cancer in Greece
Burials at the First Cemetery of Athens
20th-century Greek actresses